Courts of Colorado include:
;State courts of Colorado
Colorado Supreme Court
Colorado Court of Appeals
Colorado District Courts (22 judicial districts)
Colorado County Courts

Federal courts located in Colorado
United States Court of Appeals for the Tenth Circuit (headquartered in Denver, having jurisdiction over the United States District Courts of Colorado, Kansas, New Mexico, Oklahoma, Utah, and Wyoming)
United States District Court for the District of Colorado

See also
 Judiciary of Colorado

References

External links
National Center for State Courts – directory of state court websites.

Courts in the United States